Crayons of Askalan is a 2011 documentary film based on the story of Palestinian artist Zuhdi Al Adawi. In 1975, at the age of fifteen Zuhdi is imprisoned in the high security Israeli jail, Askalan. With the help of his fellow prisoners and their families, he keeps his spirit alive through artistic expression, smuggling in color crayons and smuggling out his artwork, with a pillowcase as his canvas.
It was selected to compete at the 2012 HOT DOCS International Documentary Festival, the 2012 CPH:Dox Festival and 2011 Doha Tribeca Film Festival, among many others.

References

External links
 

2011 films
2011 documentary films
2010s Arabic-language films
Palestinian documentary films
Spanish documentary films
Lebanese documentary films